Wecht is the surname of the following people:
Cyril Wecht (born 1931), American forensic pathologist
David Wecht (born 1962), Associate Justice of the Supreme Court of Pennsylvania, U.S.
Christoph Wecht (born 1967), Austrian professor of management by design 
Brian Wecht (born 1975), American theoretical physicist, comedian, musician and music producer